Alexey Vitalyevich Stukalskiy (born 8 July 1988) is a Russian curler. He plays fourth stones for Andrey Drozdov on the Russian national team.

Career
Stukalskiy began curling at the age of 15. He played in his first World Curling Championships for Russia under skip Andrey Drozdov at the 2013 Ford World Men's Curling Championship, finishing in tenth place. Stukalskiy was named to the Russian team at the 2014 Winter Olympics, and the team finished in seventh place with a 3–6 win–loss record.

References

External links

Olympic profile - Sochi 2014 

Russian male curlers
Living people
1988 births
Curlers at the 2014 Winter Olympics
Olympic curlers of Russia
Curlers from Moscow
Russian curling champions
Russian State Social University alumni
Universiade medalists in curling
Universiade silver medalists for Russia
Competitors at the 2015 Winter Universiade